Kim Yong-Gwang (Hangul: 김용광; born 18 September 1992) is a North Korean professional footballer who plays as a striker for Hwaebul Sports Club in the DPR Korea League.

International career
Kim made his debut for North Korea in a 2015 EAFF East Asian Cup game against Japan. He replaced Ri Hyok-chol in the 90+1st minute. His second appearance came against Yemen, where he once again replaced Ri.

References

External links
 
 
 Profile at FIFA
 Kim Yong-gwang at DPRKFootball

1992 births
Living people
Sportspeople from Pyongyang
North Korean footballers
North Korea international footballers
Association football forwards